The 2004–05 Serbia and Montenegro Cup was the third season of the Serbia and Montenegro's annual football cup. The cup defenders was Red Star Belgrade, but was defeated by FK Železnik in the final.

First round
Thirty-two teams entered in the First Round. The matches were played on 20, 22, 29 September, 6 and 20 October 2004.

|}
Note: Roman numerals in brackets denote the league tier the clubs participated in the 2004–05 season.

Second round
The 16 winners from the prior round enter this round. The matches were played on 26 and 27 October 2004.

|}
Note: Roman numerals in brackets denote the league tier the clubs participated in the 2004–05 season.

Quarter-finals
The eight winners from the prior round enter this round. The matches were played on 10 November 2004.

|}
Note: Roman numerals in brackets denote the league tier the clubs participated in the 2004–05 season.

Semi-finals

Note: Roman numerals in brackets denote the league tier the clubs participated in the 2004–05 season.

Final

See also
 2004–05 First League of Serbia and Montenegro

References

External links
Results on RSSSF

Serbia and Montenegro Cup
Cup
Cup
Serbia